My Riot is the third studio album by Roger Miret and the Disasters. It was released on August 22, 2006 via Sailor's Grave Records. It is their first album not released on Hellcat Records.

Track listing
All songs by Roger Miret unless otherwise noted.
 "Warning! Warning!" – 1:41
 "Roots Rockin' Roll" – 1:49
 "My Riot" – 2:41
 "NoHo SoHo" – 1:35
 "Ramones" – 2:25
 "Janie and Johnny" – 2:08
 "Everything I Do" – 1:27
 "Once Were Warriors" – 3:15
 "Straightjacket" – 2:01
 "Fuck You" – 0:50
 "R.F.F.R" – 1:52
 "Pride" – 2:19
 "Emily" – 2:23
 "Another Generation" – 2:46
 "T.V News" – 1:03
 "Runaway Reggae Remix" (Miret, Rhys Kill, King Django) – 5:39
Listed as bonus track

Credits
Roger Miret – vocals, guitar
Rhys Kill – guitar, vocals
Brian Darwas – bass, vocals
Luke Rota – drums
Al Barr – guest vocals on "Once Were Warriors"
Lars Frederiksen – guest vocals on "Roots Rockin' Roll"
Patricia Day – guest vocals on "R.F.F.R."
Kim Nekroman – guitar on "R.F.F.R."
Vic Ruggiero – piano on "Warning! Warning!" and organ on "Janie and Johnny", "My Riot", and "Runaway Reggae Remix"

Roger Miret and The Disasters albums
2006 albums